Clube da Criança was a Brazilian children's television series in the Rede Manchete between June 6, 1983 and August 14, 1998.

The attraction was exhibited from Monday to Sunday at 5:00 p.m. and Saturdays at 4:30 p.m. by mixing jokes with the audience, drawings and toy raffles.

Background
In 1983, the director Maurício Shermann, then hired from TV Band decided to create a new children's show for programming. Remembering all the attractions for this age group he has already created, Shermann noted that in all of them they always had a pretty girl in charge. So he decided to invite Xuxa to present the show called TV Criança, and had a member of his team go to Rio de Janeiro to look for Model.

There was no success with the attempt. Xuxa refused and even Alda, the mother of TV hots, even went to the room of Mauricio on the station asking for explanations about the invitation, which she suspected of the director's ulterior motives.

Two months after leaving Bandeirantes, Shermann headed for the Manchete, a station where he also controlled a publishing house where Xuxa was often the cover of some publications. And again, the director tried to convince the then model to present a children's show. Surprised by the invitation, the model refused the invitation, claiming that she was following an international career as a model and the project did not interest her. Then, Mauricio talked to the player Pelé, boyfriend of Xuxa at the time, that guaranteed that she would accept the project. So the director marked the first recording of the show for two weeks later.

Development
The TV show, It premiered on June 6, 1983 at 5 pm led by Xuxa who played games, raffles, announced cartoons and received guests. After leaving Xuxa (1983-1986) for Globo TV in 1986, the program was canceled, and was replaced by the childish TV show Lupu Limpim Claplá Topô. He returned in October 1987, hosted by Angélica (1987-1993) (as well as Xuxa, debuting in children's programs), then only 13 years old. After the transfer of Angelica to the SBT (1993), the program was hosted by the actress Mylla Christie (1993-1994). In the same year by former Miss Patrícia Nogueira (1994-1995), but due to lack of financial resources, she left the air in 1995. After two years out of the air, the program returned being hosted by Debby Lagranha (1997-1998). With the serious crisis of the transmitter, the program left the air again and Debby transferred to the Globo TV. The program was created and directed by Maurício Sherman.

The most enduring picture of the Club (in command of Xuxa) were the toy raffles sponsored by Estrela. In it, the children sent letters to the program asking to open one of the 3 boxes numbered that Xuxa showed in the attraction. The little boy got the surprise toy that was inside the box he asked to open it. In July 1985, Xuxa created two paintings in the Children's Club that would only become famous in the Xou da Xuxa. The first, Madame Caxuxá, which was shown only on Saturdays. In it, characterized as a gypsy, the blonde made predictions for the signs of the little ones always teaching good manners and giving tips of health and education. In the second, Vovuxa, characterized as an old lady, Xuxa told stories always with some lesson for children.

See also
 Xuxa filmography

References

1983 Brazilian television series debuts
1998 Brazilian television series endings
Portuguese-language television shows
Brazilian children's television series